"Kola" is a song by the Finnish rock band The Rasmus, originally released on the band's second album Playboys on 29 August 1997.

The song was released as a promotional single in 1997 by the record label Warner Music Finland. It was the second single from the album Playboys and features only the track "Kola".

Kola is a heavier song compared to the other tracks on Playboys. The song is about cola ("Kola" is the Finnish word for "Cola"). The band was at that moment supporting Pepsi, which can clearly be seen on the cover of the CD single.

Track listing
 "Kola" – 3:24

External links
 Lyrics

The Rasmus songs
1997 singles
Warner Music Group singles
Songs written by Lauri Ylönen
1997 songs
Songs written by Pauli Rantasalmi